Vladimer Gegeshidze (born February 10, 1985, in Tbilisi) is an amateur Georgian Greco-Roman wrestler, who competes in the men's light heavyweight category. He won a silver medal in the same weight division at the 2013 European Wrestling Championships, coincidentally held in his home city Tbilisi, losing out to Russian wrestler and former Olympic champion Alexei Mishin.

Gegeshidze represented Georgia at the 2012 Summer Olympics in London, where he competed in the men's 84 kg class. He defeated Azerbaijan's Saman Tahmasebi and Ukraine's Vasyl Rachyba in the preliminary rounds, before losing out the semi-final match to Russia's Alan Khugayev, who was able to score three points each in two straight periods, leaving Gegeshidze with a single point. Because Khugayev advanced further into the final round against Egyptian wrestler and former Olympic champion Karam Gaber, Gegeshidze automatically qualified for the bronze medal match, where he was defeated by Kazakhstan's Daniyal Gadzhiyev, with a three-set technical score (1–0, 0–1, 0–2), and a classification point score of 1–3.

References

External links
Profile – International Wrestling Database
NBC Olympics Profile

1985 births
Living people
Male sport wrestlers from Georgia (country)
Olympic wrestlers of Georgia (country)
Wrestlers at the 2012 Summer Olympics
Sportspeople from Tbilisi